Mariglianella is a comune (municipality) in the Metropolitan City of Naples in the Italian region Campania, located about 20 km northeast of Naples. As of 31-7-2022, it had a population of 7,729 and an area of 3.2 km2.

Mariglianella borders the following municipalities: Brusciano, Marigliano.

Demographic evolution

References

Cities and towns in Campania